The Laṇḍā scripts, from the term laṇḍā meaning "without a tail", is a Punjabi word used to refer to writing systems used in Punjab and nearby parts of North India. In Sindhi, it was known as 'Waniko' or 'Baniyañ'. It is distinct from the Lahnda language varieties, which used to be called Western Punjabi.

Laṇḍā is a script that evolved from the Śāradā during the 10th century. It was widely used in the northern and north-western part of India in the area comprising Punjab, Sindh, Kashmir and some parts of Balochistan and Khyber Pakhtunkhwa. It was used to write Punjabi, Hindustani, Sindhi, Saraiki, Balochi, Kashmiri, Pashto, and various Punjabi dialects like Pahari-Pothwari.

Variants
There are at least ten ancient scripts that were classified as Laṇḍā scripts. They were often used as the mercantile scripts of the Punjab region. 5 of them have enough information to be supported in Unicode.

Gurmukhī is used for Punjabi and sometimes for Sindhi. It evolved from Laṇḍā and is the only major Landa script in modern day usage.
Khojkī, an ecclesiastical script of the Isma'ili Khoja community, is within the Sindhi branch of the Landa family of scripts.
Khudabadi, formerly used for Sindhi, is a Laṇḍā-based script.
Mahājanī, a script previously used for the Punjabi and Mārwāṛī, is related to Laṇḍā.
Multani, former writing system of Saraiki, is a Laṇḍā-based script.

References

Further reading
Pandey, Anshuman. (2010). L2/10-271R Proposal to Encode the Sindhi Script
Pandey, Anshuman. (2010). L2/10-013R Preliminary Proposal to Encode the Landa Script
Pandey, Anshuman. (2009). L2/09-424 Proposal to Encode the Takri Script

Brahmic scripts
Sarada scripts